Le Visage Effleuré de Peine ('The Face Touched by Sorrow') is a fantasy novel written by Gisèle Prassinos, a French author of Greek origin who lived between 1920 and 2015. Published in France by Grasset publishing house in 1964, the work addresses the tension between reality and fiction, with a critical perspective towards rigid social norms, specially those defended by the bourgeois society of that time.
Le Visage Effleuré de Peine is also a romantic novel that explores the complex nature of love and friendship. Despite its anti-sentimental approach, the book portrays a vivid and nuanced picture of human relationships.

Synopsis
Essentielle is a young girl with a portentous imagination who is married by proxy to a reputed scholar older than her, a man with a face touched by sorrow who has a mechanical brain.
The girl, bored with her new life, so lonely due to her husband's intellectual confinement, decides to escape. However, the scholar discovers her escape plan in time and his brain breaks down due to the inability to process his emotions. Essentielle, repentant, decides to do everything in her power to repair his husband's artificial brain and recover him.

Editions
French
Grasset (1964)
Éditions du Cardinal (2000), edited by Annie Richard and featuring the original nouvelle Les machines c'est différent.
Zulma (2004, 2015)
Spanish
Libros de la Ballena (2023)

References

Fantasy novels